GXT was an Italian subscription-based comedy/entertainment television channel.

History
Jetix Europe launched GXT as a male teen channel in May 2005 on Mondo Sky. On June 1, 2008, a 1-hour-timeshift of GXT was launched on Sky Italia.

Due to Disney's decision to rebrand the Jetix Europe operation under the Disney XD brand umbrella, the Italian subsidiary of Jetix Europe, Jetix Italy S.r.l., bought the Italian Jetix network, renamed itself as Switchover Media, agreed to let the Jetix Italy channel rebrand itself to Disney XD Italy, and purchased K-2 and GXT from Jetix Europe in June 2009. With the acquisition of Switchover Media in January 2013 by Discovery Communications, GXT began to be managed by Discovery EMEA.

On December 31, 2014, GXT and its timeshift ceased broadcasting, after Discovery decided to not renew their broadcast deal with Sky Italia to operate the network.

Contents
GXT is design to target a young and predominantly male audience, offering programming geared towards action, humor and excess, including game-shows such as Takeshi's Castle and Sasuke, sports entertainment programs such as WWE and American Gladiators as well as programs produced by Guinness World Records and comedy, action and horror films.

TV programs

All programs
Aquarius
Bugs Television
Crossfire
Extreme Dodgeball
Fear Factor
Guinness World Records
Guinness World Records Australia
Guinness World Records Spagna
GXT Sport Attack
HAWAII MEETS VENICE
Judo Boy
I Dudesons
I Re del Cazzeggio
I Survived a Japanese Game Show
Komitiva
Kung Faux
New American Gladiators
Ninja Warrior
Normalman
Poker Big Game
Poker World Open
Robot Wars
Roller Jam
Scull of Rap
Sport Stars Challenge
The Contender Muay thai
The Power of One
Total Wipe Out - Pronti a tutto
Gatchaman
Ultimate Poker Challenge
Unbeatable Banzuke
Wipe Out - Pronti a tutto
World Combat League
WWE
WWE After Burn
WWE Bottom Line
Battle Dome
Bullrun
Chilli Factor
Criss Angel Mindfreak
Crossfire
Dog the Bounty Hunter
Freaky
Gamebuster
Ghost Hunters
Guinness World Records Primetime
Il Filmazzo
IFSA Strongman
Masters of Combat
Slamball
Takeshi's Castle
TNA Live: Xplosion
TNA Live: iMPACT!
Total Drama
TNA Story: Pay Per View
World's Strongest Man

References

Television channels in Italy
Italian-language television stations
Television channels and stations established in 2005
Television channels and stations disestablished in 2014
Former subsidiaries of The Walt Disney Company
Warner Bros. Discovery networks